Tamazola may refer to:

Santiago Tamazola
San Juan Tamazola
Tamazola Mixtec language